John Wilcox,  D.D. (1692-1762) was Master of Clare College from 1736 until his death.

Wilcox was educated at Clare College, Cambridge. He became Fellow in 1714.  He was ordained a priest in the Church of England in 1716. He held livings at Madingley, Everton, Bedfordshire and Kensington. Wilcox was Vice-Chancellor of the University of Cambridge between 1736 and 1737, and 1751 to 1752.

He died on 16 September 1762.

References

Masters of Clare College, Cambridge
Fellows of Clare College, Cambridge
Alumni of Clare College, Cambridge
1762 deaths
1692 births
People from Grantham
18th-century English Anglican priests
Vice-Chancellors of the University of Cambridge